Manigam is situated in Anantnag tehsil and located 1 kilometer from Seer Hamdan in the Anantnag district in the Indian Union Territory of Jammu and Kashmir. It is one of 105 villages in the Anantnag Block of Khovripora along with villages like Akad, Salia, Brar and Hutmarah. The village is situated on a small plateau and it acts as connecting link between Seer Hamdan and Aishmuqam and also with Hapatnar. The main occupation of the people is farming.  Many people travel to other parts of country for selling shawls during winter season and some are working in the private sector.
One Common Service center in Manigam providing all digital services to citizens. It is because of this center this village is a digital village.

Demographics
Kashmiri is the Local language in Manigam.  Other languages spoken are Urdu and English.

References 

COMMON SERVICE CENTER MANIGAM SEER HAMDAN
096225 46655
https://maps.google.com/?cid=11321245577779093969&entry=gps

Villages in Anantnag district